Sarmad Ghafoor (born November 5, 1975 in London, United Kingdom) is a Pakistani record producer, guitarist, vocalist, and songwriter. He has released two albums, one with Rungg (his  former band), and one with Qayaas (his current band).  He has also produced albums for a wide variety of artists, including Atif Aslam, Bilal Khan, Nusrat Hussain, Abbas Ali Khan, and Overload. Sarmad is best known for his work producing two platinum albums for Atif Aslam, including Jal Pari.

As producer

Sarmad started his production career working in his own studio, SnM Studios in the basement of his parents' Peshawar, Pakistan home, recording his own band Rungg, and his brother Sajid Ghafoor's band Still. Later Sarmad moved his studio to Islamabad, where it is located. He has worked with a number of local bands, including Irtaash, Jehangir Aziz Hayat and Saturn. Sarmad is also the producer for Atif Aslam and mixed Qayaas's Uss Paar.

As recording artist 
As well as being a producer, Sarmad is also a songwriter, musician and recording artist. Sarmad sings; plays the guitar, Bass, and drums. He's played Drums, Bass, and Guitars on numerous singles, and albums.

As composer 
Sarmad has written music scores for documentaries, and short films including Frame, by Hammad Khan. He also composed the song Kaho with Atif Aslam for Shoaib Mansoor's film Bol. He was also featured in the video of that song with Atif Aslam and Hadiqa Kiani.

Discography

Production credits

Albums

References 

Pakistani guitarists
Living people
1975 births
People from Peshawar
Pashtun people
21st-century guitarists
Pakistani heavy metal guitarists
Pakistani rock guitarists